The shooting competitions at the 2019 Southeast Asian Games in the Philippines were held at the Pradera Verde in Lubao, Pampanga.

Medal table

Medalists

Olympic shooting

Precision pistol competition

Metallic silhouette shooting

Benchrest shooting

References

External links
 

2019 Southeast Asian Games events
2019
2019 in shooting sports